is a Japanese light novel series written by Suzu Miyama and illustrated by Hotosoka. It has been published online via the user-generated novel publishing website Shōsetsuka ni Narō since June 2018. It was later acquired by Kodansha, who has released eight volumes since May 2019 under their Kodansha Ranobe Books imprint. A manga adaptation illustrated by Moto Shigemura has been serialized in Square Enix's Manga UP! website since January 2019; seven tankōbon volumes have been released as of September 2022. An anime television series adaptation by EMT Squared aired from October to December 2022.

Plot
Rein is a beast tamer who was expelled from the hero Arios' party who consider him too weak because he only has the ability to form contract with animals. While looking for work, Rein rescues Kanade, a member of the cat tribe who becomes his companion. By forming a contract with a member from one of the strongest races, Rein obtains some of her powers, becoming much stronger. The two then begin their journey together, with Rein befriending and taming other girls from different races who become powerful companions while obtaining new abilities with each new contract formed, his group eventually becoming far more powerful than Arios and his party. Overcome with anger and frustration, Arios begins loathing Rein, neglecting his duties as a hero and focusing on revenge against him and his friends instead.

Characters

The protagonist of the series. He is a Beast Tamer who originally had no other combat skills except basic martial arts training and weak fire and healing spells, which leads him to be expelled from the hero's party. However, upon meeting Kanade and making a contract with her, Rein learns that he can also obtain other skills from members of strongest races, which makes him stronger with each new contract. Rein is also a skilled strategist, capable of taming multiple animals at once and using their abilities to have the advantage in combat. Rein's optimistic and caring attitude makes him earn the respect of his friends and the loyalty of his partners, who also eventually fall in love with him. Later Rein discovers that he is a descendant of the original Hero who obtained power directly from the gods, which is the reason why his abilities far surpasses those of regular Beast Tamers.

A teenage member of the Cat Tribe, the rarest of the strongest races, Kanade left her hometown in search for adventure until she is rescued by Rein and she becomes his friend, agreeing to be his partner. She possesses superhuman strength and endurance, a trait that Rein inherits upon making a contract with her.

A teenage member of the Dragon Race, Tania travels the world challenging other fighters until she is defeated by Rein and Kanade. Upon befriending them, she decides to join the party as Rein's second partner. Tania possesses enhanced magical ability and Rein's contract with her increases the power of his spells.
  
 Francine Gonzalez (Sora), Celeste Perez (Runa) (English)
Twin sisters from the Fairy Race. Rein and the others first met Sora when she was trying to rescue Luna from a monster alone, until they helped her. Since then they became close to Rein and became his third and fourth partner. Sora is more polite and reserved while Luna is more mischievous and playful. Both can hide their wings using magic to cover their true identity. Sora can conjure illusions and her contract with Rein gives him the ability to cast multiple spells in succession, while Luna is capable of enhancing and tuning another person's magic, improving the effectiveness of her and her sister's spells and her contract with Rein made him immune to the effect of abnormal conditions, including instant death magic.

The vice-captain turned Captain of the Horizon branch of the Order of Knights. When Rein stands up to the mayor of Horizon, she asks him for help in taking down the corrupt knights and arresting the lord and Edgar for the many crimes they committed.

A member of the Demigod Race, she is a child with fox features. Nina was worshipped as a deity on her homeland, until she is captured and turned into a slave upon being forced to wear a magic collar to restrain her, until she is rescued by Rein, who uses his magic break Nina free from the collar and she becomes his fifth partner. Nina can teleport herself and others with her instantly and her contract with Rein gives him the power to materialize specific items with his magic.

The ghost of a young maid haunting a mansion, she befriends Rein and his party after they buy the mansion and move there. After Rein's group help Tina enact revenge by having her murderer arrested for the crime, she becomes his sixth partner. Her contract with Rein gives him the power to manipulate gravity.

A young child member of the Celestial Race, considered the most powerful of the strongest races, able to cast divine magic. She loathes humans and after being freed from her seal by Arios, she agrees with his plea to kill Rein for him. However, upon meeting Rein, she becomes interested in him instead, eventually befriending him and becoming his seventh partner. Aside from casting various types of magic, Iris can summon weapons and animals to assist in battle, a trait that Rein inherits with their contract, albeit with less proficiency.

A member of the Oni Race, vampire branch, who can manipulate her blood to use as a weapon and perform powerful shadow magic. She meets Rein and the others while looking for help to deal with demons attacking her hometown. After her hometown is saved, she becomes Rein's eighth partner, their contract giving him the power to charm or paralyze enemies with his glance.

 (Japanese); Alejandro Saab (English)
The main antagonist of the series. Arios is the Hero chosen by the king to slay the Demon Lord and defeat his army. As a descendant of the original Hero, Arios possesses a skill called "Limit Break" which means that his growth potential as a warrior is limitless. However, after being defeated by Rein, who became much stronger since he was expelled from his party, Arios becomes extremely jealous of him, to the point of making plans to ensure his downfall. When Arios' true colors are exposed by the royalty, his title is revoked by the king. In response, Arios betrays his party and joins forces with the demons instead, certain that they can help him enact his revenge.

Media

Light novels
Written by Suzu Miyama began publication as a web novel on the novel publishing site Shōsetsuka ni Narō on June 11, 2018. The series was later acquired by Kodansha who have published it in print as a light novel with illustrations by Hotosoka since May 2, 2019. The announcement of printed version and manga adaptation was on the same date, October 20, 2018. As of July 1, 2022, eight volumes have been released.

Manga
A manga adaptation illustrated by Moto Shigemura began serialization in Square Enix's Manga UP! website on January 30, 2019. The first volume was released on June 12, 2019. As of September 2022, seven volumes have been released.

Anime
An anime television series adaptation was announced on June 10, 2022. The series is animated by EMT Squared and directed by Atsushi Nigorikawa, with Takashi Aoshima overseeing the series' scripts, Shuuhei Yamamoto designing the characters, and Yuki Hayashi, Alisa Okehazama, and Naoyuki Chikatani composing the music. It aired from October 2 to December 25, 2022, on AT-X, Tokyo MX, ytv, TVA, and BS Fuji. The opening theme song is "Change The World" by MADKID, while the ending theme song is "LOVE＆MOON" by Marika Kouno. Crunchyroll licensed the series outside of Asia, and have streamed an English dub starting on October 15, 2022. Muse Communication licensed it in South and Southeast Asia.

Notes

References

External links
 at Shōsetsuka ni Narō 
 
 

2022 anime television series debuts
2019 Japanese novels
Anime and manga based on light novels
Crunchyroll anime
EMT Squared
Fantasy anime and manga
Gangan Comics manga
Harem anime and manga
Japanese fantasy novels
Japanese webcomics
Kodansha books
Light novels
Light novels first published online
Muse Communication
Shōnen manga
Shōsetsuka ni Narō
Webcomics in print